John McCartney (1870 – c. 1942) was a Scottish footballer who played at half-back for Liverpool. He was born in Darvel, Ayrshire, Scotland.

Life and playing career
John McCartney played for Newmilns F.C., St Mirren and New Brighton Tower. McCartney was signed by John McKenna for the Reds in 1892, 1 of the 13 Scottish footballers that Liverpool brought in at the beginning of the club's history.

McCartney went on to make 167 appearances for Liverpool scoring 6 times. He also helped them win the Second Division championship in both the 1893/94 and 1895/96 seasons.

He played in 16 of the 28 games during Liverpool's promotion winning side of 1893/94, he scored once that season in a 5-0 drubbing of Woolwich Arsenal, later to become Arsenal
 
McCartney had to miss most of the promotion winning 1895/96 season but returned just in time to make a difference in the 4 promotion gaining test matches. He played 2 more seasons at Anfield missing just 3 matches, he left the club in 1898.

Career details
As a player

McCartney played 167 times for Liverpool scoring 6 goals. He won the Second Division Championship with Liverpool in both 1893/94 and 1895/6.

External links
John McCartney at LFC History

Liverpool F.C. players
St Mirren F.C. players
Scottish footballers
1870 births
1940s deaths
New Brighton Tower F.C. players
Association football wing halves